The Sandy Tithing Office is a historic building in Sandy, Utah. It was built in 1906-1907 as a tithing building for the Church of Jesus Christ of Latter-day Saints. Iy was designed in the Victorian Eclectic style, with a pyramid roof and a gabled pavilion. The bishop of the Sandy ward at the time was William D. Kuhre. The builder and architect are not known. The building has been listed on the National Register of Historic Places since January 25, 1985.

References

National Register of Historic Places in Salt Lake County, Utah
Victorian architecture in Utah
Religious buildings and structures completed in 1906
Tithing buildings of the Church of Jesus Christ of Latter-day Saints
1906 establishments in Utah